Łukasz Kadziewicz (born 20 September 1980) is a Polish former professional volleyball player, a member of the Poland national team in 2001–2009. A participant of the Olympic Games (Athens 2004, Beijing 2008), and a silver medalist at the 2006 World Championship. He worked as a volleyball commentator for Polsat Sport.

Personal life
Łukasz Kadziewicz was born in Dobre Miasto, Poland. He was married to Kamila. Their daughter, Amelia was born on 21 March 2006. Łukasz and Kamila divorced in 2008. He is married, for a second time, to Barbara (née Gołąb).

When Łukasz was a member of the Polish national team he created the "Kadziu Project". He filmed videos that showed how the Polish team prepared for matches and their lifestyle during tournaments (for example the Olympics in Beijing, 2008). When Kadziewicz ended his career in the national team, Krzysztof Ignaczak took up his idea, continuing this work under the name "Igłą Szyte". In 2013, Kadziewicz reactivated the "Kadziu Project", but instead of showing life in the national team, he now films interviews with other volleyball players and talks about his thoughts related to volleyball.

He took part in the 17th season of Polish version of Dancing with the Stars. He was partnered with the professional dancer Agnieszka Kaczorowska.

Career

Clubs
In 2013,  Kadziewicz moved to MKS Cuprum Lubin, which played in 1st league of Polish Volleyball League. Club promoted to PlusLiga and debuted in the match with Asseco Resovia Rzeszów on October 6, 2014. Kadziewicz is the captain of his current club. He decided to end up his career as player in 2015.

Honours

Clubs
 National championships
 2003/2004  Polish Championship, with PZU AZS Olsztyn
 2005/2006  Polish Championship, with Jastrzębski Węgiel
 2006/2007  Polish Championship, with Jastrzębski Węgiel
 2009/2010  Russian Championship, with Lokomotiv Belgorod
 2012/2013  Belarusian Championship, with Shakhtar Soligorsk

Individual awards
 2005: Polish Championship – Best Middle Blocker
 2006: Polish Championship – Best Middle Blocker
 2007: Polish Championship – Best Middle Blocker
 2008: Polish Championship – Best Middle Blocker

State awards
 2006:  Gold Cross of Merit

References

External links

 
 Player profile at PlusLiga.pl 
 Player profile at LegaVolley.it 
 Player profile at Volleybox.net 

1980 births
Living people
People from Dobre Miasto
Polish men's volleyball players
Olympic volleyball players of Poland
Volleyball players at the 2004 Summer Olympics
Volleyball players at the 2008 Summer Olympics
Recipients of the Gold Cross of Merit (Poland)
Polish expatriate sportspeople in Russia
Expatriate volleyball players in Russia
Polish expatriate sportspeople in Italy
Expatriate volleyball players in Italy
Polish expatriate sportspeople in Qatar
Expatriate volleyball players in Qatar
Polish expatriate sportspeople in Belarus
AZS Olsztyn players
Jastrzębski Węgiel players
Trefl Gdańsk players
Modena Volley players
Cuprum Lubin players
Middle blockers